Qarah Bolagh (also Romanized as Qarah Bolāgh and Qareh Bolāgh) is a village in Kolah Boz-e Sharqi Rural District, in the Central District of Meyaneh County, East Azerbaijan Province, Iran. At the 2006 census, its population was 280, in 66 families.

References 

Populated places in Meyaneh County